Amy Moore (born 17 December 1973) is a road cyclist from Canada. She represented her nation at the 2003, 2004, 2005 and 2006 UCI Road World Championships.

References

External links
 profile at Procyclingstats.com

1973 births
Canadian female cyclists
Living people
People from Welland
20th-century Canadian women
21st-century Canadian women